Daegu, formerly spelled Taegu and officially known as the Daegu Metropolitan City, is a city in South Korea.

It is the third-largest urban agglomeration in South Korea after Seoul and Busan; it is the third-largest official metropolitan area in the nation with over 2.5 million residents; and the second-largest city after Busan in the Yeongnam region in southeastern Korean Peninsula.  Daegu and surrounding North Gyeongsang Province are often referred to as Daegu-Gyeongbuk, with a total population over 5 million.

The Daegu basin is the central plain of the Yeongnam region. In ancient times, the Daegu area was part of the proto-kingdom Jinhan. Subsequently, Daegu came under the control of the Silla Kingdom, which unified the Korean Peninsula. During the Joseon Dynasty period, the city was the capital of Gyeongsang-do, one of the traditional eight provinces of the country.

Daegu was an economic motor of Korea during the 1960s–1980s period and was especially known for its electronics industry. The humid subtropical climate of Daegu is ideal for producing high-quality apples, thus the nickname, "Apple City". Daegu is also known as "Textile City". Textiles used to be the pillar industry of the city. With the establishment of the Daegu-Gyeongbuk Free Economic Zone, Daegu is currently focusing on fostering fashion and high-tech industries.

Daegu was the host city of the 22nd World Energy Congress, the 2011 World Championships in Athletics and the 2003 Summer Universiade. It also hosted four matches in the 2002 FIFA World Cup.

History

Prehistory and early history
Archaeological investigations in the Greater Daegu area have revealed a large number of settlements and burials of the prehistoric Mumun Pottery Period (around 1500–300 BC). In fact, some of the earliest evidence of Mumun settlement in Gyeongsangdo have been excavated from Siji-dong and Seobyeon-dong. Dongcheon-dong is one of the substantial Mumun agricultural villages that have been excavated. The Dongcheon-dong site dates back to the Middle Mumun (around 850–550 BC) and contains the remains of many prehistoric pit-houses and agricultural fields. Megalithic burials (dolmens) have also been found in large numbers in Daegu.

Ancient historical texts indicate that during the Proto–Three Kingdoms (Mahan, Jinhan, and Byeonhan) period, Daegu was the site of a chiefdom or walled-town polity known from that time, according to historical records, as Dalgubeol. It was absorbed into the kingdom of Silla no later than the fifth century. The vestiges of the wall can be seen, and relics have been excavated in the current Dalseong Park.

Silla
Silla succeeded in unifying the Korean peninsula by defeating the other kingdoms of Baekje and Goguryeo in the late seventh century, partly due to assistance from China's Tang Dynasty. Shortly thereafter, in 689, Silla's King Sinmun considered moving the capital from Gyeongju to Daegu, but was unable to do so. This initiative is known only through a single line in the Samguk Sagi, a most valued historical record of ancient Korea by Koryeo Dynasty historian Kim Bu-sik, but it is presumed to indicate both an attempt by the Silla king to reinforce royal authority and the entrenched resistance of the Gyeongju political elites that was the likely cause of the move's failure. The city was given its current name in 757.

In the late 1990s, archaeologists excavated a large-scale fortified Silla site in Dongcheon-dong, Buk-gu. The site at Locality 2 consists of the remains of 39 raised-floor buildings enclosed by a formidable ditch-and-palisade system. The excavators hypothesize that the fortified site was a permanent military encampment or barracks. Archaeologists also uncovered a large Silla village dating to the sixth to seventh centuries AD at Siji-dong.

Later Three Kingdoms and Goryeo
During the Later Three Kingdoms period, 892–936, Daegu was initially aligned with Hubaekje. In 927, northern Daegu was the site of the Battle of Gong Mountain between the forces of Goryeo under Wang Geon and those of Hubaekje under Gyeon Hwon. In this battle, the forces of Goryeo were crushed and Wang Geon himself was saved only by the heroic deed of his general Shin Sung-gyeom. However, the atrocities of the Hubaekje forces at this time apparently changed local sympathizers to favor Wang Geon, who later became the king of Goryeo.

Numerous place names and local legends in the area still bear witness to the historic battle of 927. Among these are "Ansim", which literally means "peace of mind", said to be the first place where Wang Geon dared to stop after escaping the battle, and "Banwol", or half-moon, where he is said to have stopped and admired the moon before returning to Goryeo. A statue commemorating the battle now stands in northern Daegu, as does a memorial to Sin Sunggyeom.

In the Goryeo period, the first edition of the Tripitaka Koreana was stored in Daegu, at the temple of Buinsa. However, this edition was destroyed when the temple was sacked in 1254, during the Mongol invasions of Korea.

Joseon

Daegu served as an important transportation center during the Joseon Dynasty. She stands in the mid part of the Great Yeongnam Road which ran between Seoul and Busan. It lay at the junction of this arterial road and the roads to Gyeongju and Jinju.

In 1601, Daegu became the administrative capital of the Gyeongsang-do, which is current Daegu, Busan, Ulsan, Gyeongsangbuk-do, and Gyeongsangnam-do. At about that time, the city began to grow into a major city. The status continued for nearly 300 years, and the city has been transformed as the capital of Gyeongsangbuk-do since Gyeongsang-do was divided into two provinces, Gyeongsangbuk-do (northern Gyeongsang-province) and Gyeongsangnam-do (southern one) in 1896.

Daegu's first regular markets were established during the late Joseon period. The most famous of these is the Yangnyeongsi herbal medicine market. This became a center of herbal trade in Joseon, and even attracted buyers from neighboring countries. Traders from Japan, who were not permitted to leave the Nakdong River valley, hired messengers to visit the market on their behalf. Seomun Market, which stood at the city's west gate at that time, was one of the top-three markets in the Joseon period.

Korean Empire and colonial rule
Japanese imperialism forcibly opened up Korea's markets beginning in the late 19th century. In 1895, Daegu became the site of one of the country's first modern post offices, as a part of the 'Gab-o' reforms introduced in the aftermath of the First Sino-Japanese war.

Beginning in the late 1890s, increasing numbers of foreign merchants and workers started to visit Daegu, which emerged as a modern transportation center of the newly constructed Gyeongbu Line main railroad connecting Seoul and Busan.

In 1905, the old fortress wall was forcibly destroyed. As a tribute to the wall, streets that now run where the wall once stood have been named Dongseongno and Bukseongno, which translates as "east fortress street" and "north fortress street" respectively.

Independence movements against imperial aggressions were outstanding in Daegu. These began as early as 1898, when a branch of the Independence Club was opened in the town. As the demise of the Korean Empire approached in 1907, local citizens led by Seo Sang-don organized the National Debt Repayment Movement. The movement spread nationwide, although it fell short of repaying the national debt through individual donations. Freedom fighting continued after the 1910 annexation, notably during the March 1st movement of 1919. At that time, four major demonstrations took place in Daegu, involving an estimated 23,000 peace-loving citizens.

After 1945
In 1946, the Daegu October Incident took place, one of the most serious social disorders since the foundation of the Republic of Korea. On October 1, Korean national police killed three student demonstrators and injured many others. It was also the site of major demonstrations on February 28, 1960, prior to the presidential election of that year.

Daegu and all of North Gyeongsang province had heavy guerrilla activities in the late 1940s, as thousands of refugees shied away from the fighting in Jeolla province and sought shelters in Daegu. In November 1948, a unit in Daegu joined the mutiny which had begun in Yeosu the previous month. As in many other areas during the Korean War, political killings of dissenters were widespread.

During the Korean War, heavy fighting occurred nearby along the Nakdong River. Daegu sat inside the Pusan Perimeter, however, so it remained in South Korean hands throughout the war. The fighting that prevented North Korean troops from crossing the Nakdong River has become known as the Battle of Taegu.

In the second half of the 20th century, the city underwent explosive growth, and the population has increased more than tenfold since the end of the Korean War. The city was politically favored during the 18-year-long rule of Park Chung-hee, when it and the surrounding area served as his political base. Daegu champions conservative political ideas and movements today and is a political base for the Saenuri Party.

In the 1980s, Daegu separated from Gyeongsangbuk-do and became a separately administered provincial-level directly governed city (Jikhalsi), and was redesignated as a metropolitan city (Gwangyeoksi) in 1995. Today, Daegu is the third-largest metropolitan area in Korea with respect to both population and commerce.

Since 1990, Daegu has suffered two of South Korea's worst mass casualty disasters: the 1995 Daegu gas explosions, which killed 101 people, and the 2003 Daegu subway fire, which killed 192 people.

In February 2020, Daegu was the epicenter of the COVID-19 pandemic in South Korea.

Politics

Two local governments are in the city, the Daegu Metropolitan Government in Jung District and Gyeongbuk Provincial Government in Buk District. The provincial government will be relocated to Andong in its proper province, Gyeongbuk.As a result, the provincial government office was relocated to Andong in January 2023. The mayor and heads of city's eight districts are directly elected by the citizens every four years. The city council has 29 members which consist of 26 from the same number of electoral districts and three proportional representations. They are also directly elected every four years. Most of them are the members of the Liberty Korea Party, the main conservative political party in South Korea. Daegu is a stronghold for the party and has produced two Presidents of the Republic of Korea thus far: Roh Tae-woo and Park Geun-hye. As the capital of the Korean conservatives, the city has wielded strong political influence in elections.

Administrative divisions

Daegu is divided into 7 districts (Gu) and 1 county (Gun)
Jung District – means the central district.
Dong District – means the east district.
Seo District – means the west district.
Nam District – means the south district.
Buk District – means the north district.
Suseong District
Dalseo District
Dalseong County

Geography

Topography

Daegu sits in a basin surrounded by low mountains. Palgongsan to the north, Biseulsan to the south, Waryongsan to the west, and a series of smaller hills in the east. The Geumho River flows along the northern and eastern edges of the city, emptying in the Nakdong River west of the city.

Climate

Daegu has a cooler version of a humid subtropical climate (Köppen: Cwa). In Holdridge climate classification, Daegu has a warm temperate moist forest climate. The mountains that comprise the basin trap hot and humid air. Similarly, in winter, cold air lies in the basin. The area receives little precipitation except during the rainy season of summer, and is sunny throughout much of the year. In summer 2018, high temperatures led to the emergence of a new term called Dae-Frika (Daegu+Africa) starting with the internet community, and has been used in the media, broadcasting, etc. Summers in Daegu are some of the hottest in the Korean peninsula.

Economy

Daegu is a manufacturing industry city. The major industries are textiles, metals and machinery. In the year 2021, Daegu had a regional GDP of $44,144 million. Many companies such as Daegu Bank, Korea Delphi, Hwasung corp., and TaeguTec are situated in this city, and Samsung and Kolon were founded here. Numerous factories are located in the industrial complexes situated in the west and north sides of the city including the Seongseo Industrial Complex, West Daegu Industrial Complex and the Daegu Dyeing Industrial Complex.

The city is the economic and industrial core of the Daegu-Gyeongbuk region, one of the major industrial areas in Korea. It accounted for as much as 94 percent of Korea's trade surplus in 2006. The electronics industries in Gumi and the steel industries in Pohang provided great services to that surplus. World-leading manufacturing facilities for Anycall (Samsung Mobile) and POSCO's main factories are located near the city. Daegu and its neighbouring cities were designated for the Daegu-Gyeongbuk Free Economic Zone by the central government in 2008. It is specialized companies like Winitech software company in knowledge-based service and manufacturing industries.

Historically, Daegu has been the commercial center of the southern part of the Korean Peninsula with Seoul in the center and Pyongyang in the north (currently North Korea), because of its advantageous location. Some of the large, traditional markets like Seomun Market are still flourishing in the city.

Additionally, Daegu was considered the third major economic city in Korea, after Seoul and Busan. However, due to the decline of the textile industry, which is the heart of Daegu's economy, the overall economic growth of the city has also fallen.

Also, the city is the warmest region in South Korea due to the humid subtropical climate. This climate condition provides the region with high quality apples and oriental melons. The fruit industry is a crucial support for the local economy. Due to the stagnant economy, Daegu's population began to decrease after 2003. Recently, the local government has begun focusing on working towards economic revival and concentrating on improving the city's fashion industry.

Fashion industry
Beginning in the late 1990s, Daegu has been actively making efforts to promote its fashion industry based on its textile and clothing manufacturing industries under the 'Daegu: Fashion City'. The city opens many exhibitions related to the fashion and textile industries including the Daegu Fashion Fair and Preview in Daegu annually or semi-annually, and invites national institutes. A large new town specializing in the textile-fashion industries is currently under construction in Bongmu-dong, northeastern Daegu. The district, officially named Esiapolis, takes aim at the fashion hub of East Asia. Textile complexes, textile-fashion institutions, an international school, fashion malls as well as residential areas plan to be developed in the district.

Culture and sightseeing

Generally, Daegu is known as a conservative city. As well as being the largest inland city in the country beside Seoul it has become one of the major metropolitan areas in the nation. Traditionally, Buddhism has been strong; today there are still many temples. Confucianism is also popular in Daegu, with a large academy based in the city. Neon cross-topped spires of Christian churches can also be seen in the city.

Sights
The most well-known sight of the city is the stone Buddha called Gatbawi on the top of Gwanbong, Palgongsan. It is famous for its stone gat (Korean traditional hat). People from all over the country visit the place, because they believe that the Buddha will grant one's single desire. Administratively, the site itself is located in the neighboring city, Gyeongsan, Gyeongbuk.

On the outskirts of the city, mountains keep many traditional temples such as Donghwasa, Pagyesa, and Buinsa. Donghwasa is a Buddhist temple that was built by Priest Geukdal-hwasang in 493, and many artifacts of the period are found around the temple. The International Tourist Zen Meditation Center is Korea's only Zen-themed center. Some lecture halls or memorial halls such as Dodong-seowon and Nokdong-seowon are also located in the suburbs.

Old villages have been preserved, such as the Otgol village (Gyeongju Choi clan's original residence area) and the Inheung village (Nampyeong Muns). In the urban area, the Joseon Dynasty's administrative or educational buildings including Gyeongsang-gamyeong and Daegu-hyanggyo also remain. The main gateway of the city in that period called Yeongnam-jeilmun (meaning the first gateway in Yeongnam), has been restored in Mangudang Park. Western style modern architecture like Gyesan Cathedral and the old building of Jeil Church are preserved across the urban area. Gyesan Cathedral is the third oldest gothic church building in Korea and the cathedral of the Roman Catholic Archdiocese of Daegu which is one of three archdioceses in South Korea. Several buildings, in the present Keisung Academy and the KNU middle/high school, are famous too.

Yangnyeongsi in Namseongno (often called Yakjeon-golmok) is the oldest market for Korean medicinal herbs in the country with a history of 350 years. Bongsan-dong which has some art galleries and studios is being developed as the artistic center of the city since the 1990s.

Nearby tourist attractions include Haeinsa—a Buddhist temple that houses the Tripitaka Koreana (a woodblock edition of the Tripitaka and one of the world's oldest extant complete collections of the Buddhist scriptures). Haeinsa is located in Gayasan National Park of Hapcheon, Gyeongnam. The historic city of Gyeongju, Gyeongbuk, the capital of the ancient kingdom of Silla is located east of Daegu.

Mountains and parks

Mt. Palgong, Mt. Biseul, and Mt. Ap are the representative mountains in Daegu. Apsan, just in the southern part of the city, is the closest mountain from the urban area among them. It has many trails, Buddhist temples, a Korean War museum, and a gondola ride to the peak. Additionally, Waryongsan, Hamjisan, and Yongjibong are located in the city. These serve as neighborhood parks to the citizens. Mt. Palgong has a cable car to the summit. There are also hiking trails in the direction of the Donghwasa Temple and Sutaegol Valley.

In the urban area, several small mountains and hills play the same role. Dalseong Park, which sits inside a 1,500-year-old earth fortress, is a historic place of the city. It contains the city's only zoo and some monuments as well as the wall. Duryu Park or Duryusan is a large forest in the middle of the urban area. It has Daegu Tower, Woobang Land, Kolon Bandstand, Duryu Stadium, and many sports facilities. Daegu Tower, also called Woobang Tower or Duryu Tower, is the tallest contemporary structure (202 m) and a symbol of the city. Its observatory commands good views of the surroundings. Woobang Land is the largest amusement park out of the capital area. Many small gardens lie in the heart of the city, such as the National Debt Repayment Movement Memorial Park (Gukchae Bosang Park) and 2·28 Park. The former park includes Dalgubeol-daejong, which means the Dalgubeol grand bell. The bell is struck every week and year. There is also a botanical garden with a variety of plants and flowers.

Downtown and shopping

Dongseongno is the downtown of Daegu lying from the Daegu Station to Jung-ang pachulso (central police station) near the Banwoldang subway station in the center of the city Jung-gu. It has the Jung-angno subway station as the nearest station from its heart. Like its name meaning the street in the east fortress, the eastern part of Daegu-eupseong (means the Daegu-Principality Fortress) was situated along this street. The fortress, however, had been demolished in the early 20th century. Although Daegu is the nation's third or fourth largest city, the Dongseongno area form the largest and the broadest downtown area in the whole country except the capital city, Seoul. In most cases, famous brands open their branch shop first here out of the Greater Seoul area.

Sub-downtowns in the city have its own commercial powers and colors. The area around the Seongseo Industrial Complex subway station in Dalseo-gu is a concentration of many amusement spots, and young people easily can be seen around Kyungpook National University in Buk-gu. Deuran-gil (means the street inside the field) in Suseong-gu is known for many restaurants.

The city has a number of department stores. Many of these belong to national or multinational chains, but the local Daegu Department Store also operates two branches, while another local chain, Donga Department Store operates four in the city proper. The six department stores among them gather at the downtown. The traditional markets such as Seomun Market and Chilseong Market sell all sorts of goods.

Festivals
Many traditional ceremonies and festivals in agrarian society disappeared in the process of modernization. A Confucian ritual ceremony called Seokjeondaeje is held at Daegu-hyanggyo every spring and autumn. The Yangnyeongsi herb medical festival and Otgol village festival are the contemporary festivals about traditional culture.

Lately in the city, enthusiasm about performing arts is growing and the local government is trying to meet its demand. Daegu International Opera Festival (DIOF) in October since 2003, Daegu International Musical Festival (DIMF), and Daegu International Bodypainting Festival (DIBF) are three of the most famous festivals on each field in Korea, although those have short histories.

Various festivals in various themes like the Colorful Daegu Festival, Dongseongno festival, Palgongsan maple festival, Biseulsan azalea festival, Korea in Motion Daegu, and so on, are held by the city, each ward, or the specific groups, all through the year.

On August 25 through August 31, 2008, Daegu hosted the first ever Asian Bodypainting Festival, a sister event of the World Bodypainting Festival in Seeboden, Austria.

Each year the city is home to the Daegu International Jazz Festival: http://www.dijf.or.kr/

Every May the "Colorful Daegu Festival" offers performances and art programs including the Colorful Parade. In July, the Daegu Chimac Festival takes place at Duryu Park in Dalseo-gu, Daegu. The term "chimac" is a portmanteau of chicken and maekju (meaning "beer"). There were over 880,000 visitors in 2015, and one million visitors during the festival in 2016.

Cuisine

Daegu cuisine is similar to that consumed in the Yeongnam region. The city is known for certain unique dishes such as:
 Ttaro-gukbap: Daegu is the only part of Korea that eats the rice and soup of gukbap separately
 Mungtigi: pieces of raw beef marinated in a mixture of sesame oil, garlic, and red pepper powder
 Makchang: a dish made with beef abomasum 
 Jjimgalbi: braised beef ribs cooked in an aluminum pot with a deep spicy, sweet, and garlicky marinade 
 Nonmegi maeuntang: a spicy catfish stew made with a kelp and radish stock 
 Bogeo bulgogi: deboned blowfish grilled with beansprouts in a spicy marinade 
 Muchimhoe: a salad composed of raw fish, squid, and vegetables in a sweet and spicy sauce
 Yaki udon: spicy seafood noodle dish with vegetables, similar to a dry jjamppong
 Napjak mandu: thin dumplings filled with small amounts of dangmyeon and vegetables

Museums
Daegu Art Museum

Daegu National Museum – A notable national museum collecting relics excavated in and around Daegu
Daegu Bangjja Yugi (Korean Bronzeware) Museum
Hengso Museum of Keimyung University
Korea Video Museum
Kyungpook National University Museum
Museum for Daegu National University of Education
Museum of Natural Dye Arts
National Debt Repayment Movement Memorial Museum

Theaters
Daegu Opera House – The first theater in Korea only for performing opera
Suseong Artpia
Keimyung Art Center  – One of the largest scale theaters in the city.
Daegu Culture and Arts Center

Sports

On March 27, 2007, the city was selected to host the 2011 World Championships in Athletics. Daegu competed with cities such as Moscow, Russia, and Brisbane, Australia, to earn the votes of the IAAF Council. The event was the fourth IAAF World Championships in Athletics to be held outside Europe, and the first games in mainland Asia. It was also the third worldwide sports event held in Korea after the 1988 Summer Olympics in Seoul and 2002 FIFA World Cup in Korea and Japan, in which Daegu hosted four matches. It also hosted the 2003 Summer Universiade. The city hosts the Colorful Daegu Pre-Championships Meeting every year since 2005.

Daegu Stadium is the second largest sports complex in South Korea with a seating capacity of 66,422. Daegu Civic Stadium hosted some football matches at the 1988 Summer Olympics.

The Daegu Marathon is held here every year in April. The race begins and ends at the Daegu Stadium.

Sports teams

 Samsung Lions 

The Samsung Lions are a professional baseball team founded in 1982. They are based in the southeastern city of Daegu and are members of the KBO League. Their home stadium is Daegu Samsung Lions Park. They have won the Korean Series eight times. The Samsung Lions are the first team to win four consecutive Korean Series titles (2011, 2012, 2013, and 2014). They are also the first Korean team to win a regular league title for five consecutive years (2011, 2012, 2013, 2014, and 2015).

 Daegu FC 

Daegu Football Club was founded as a community club at the end of 2002, and made their K League debut in 2003. Historically, Daegu have often placed in the lower reaches of the K League. Their best season to date has been 2021, when they finished third out of twelve teams. They were also the winners of the Korean FA Cup in 2018, which qualified the club for their first appearance in the AFC Champions League the following year. The club has since played in the 2021 and 2022 editions of AFC Champions League.

Media
There are three terrestrial TV broadcasting stations in the city: KBS Daegu Broadcast Station, Daegu MBC, and TBC. These are affiliated companies of central broadcasting stations in Seoul just like other local broadcasting companies in South Korea. TBC (Taegu Broadcasting Corporation) depends on SBS. They cover to Gyeongsangbuk-do out of the city. Each television broadcasting company has its own radio station as well.

International Daegu
Daegu is largely a homogeneous community that includes few non-Koreans. However, a number of immigrants from South and Southeast Asia work in automotive-parts factories on the city's west side. In addition, there is a small group of English-speaking Westerners working in English schools and university programs. The American military bases are also home to several hundred Americans. Recently Chinese students have begun studying Korean at universities in Daegu, and there is an increasing number of graduate and post-graduate students from other Asian countries. As elsewhere in Korea, Korean food overwhelmingly dominates; Chinese, Japanese and Western food forms the bulk of non-Korean food but recently Indian and Russian foods have become available.

Daegu hosts three American military bases, Camp Henry, Camp George which houses Daegu American School, and Camp Walker. Camp Walker houses Daegu High School for high school children, while Camp George hold the school for elementary and middle school (both of which are primarily for children of military personnel and US Military civilian employees). Camp George also houses most of the married [Enlisted] ranked soldiers. Camp Henry and Camp Walker serve as the primary place of work for all the military personnel. Camp Walker serves as the home to enlisted Sergeants Major and Officer ranked soldiers, Major and up. Although non-military families can enroll their children at the school, most either home-school their children or send them to a small Christian private school which teaches about 25 children near the central business district of Daegu.

Religion

According to the census of 2015, 23.8% of the population followed Buddhism and 19.7% followed Christianity (12% Protestantism and 7.7% Catholicism). 55.8% of the population is irreligious.

Education

, Daegu has 232 elementary schools, 125 middle schools, and 94 high schools. There are two specialized public high schools which are Daegu Science High School and Taegu Foreign Language High School, and some other high schools such as Keisung Academy, Gyeongsin High School and Daeryun High School have good grades for university admission. Most of the well-known high schools are located in Suseong-gu because its educational grade and zeal are high standard in the country.

Also, Daegu has 4 independent private high schools like Keisung Academy (also called Keisung High School), Gyeongsin High School, Gyeong-il Girl's High School, Daegun Catholic High School'''.

Universities and colleges

Daegu and its satellite towns are one of the areas which have the largest private higher educational institutions in Korea. Many of their main campuses are located in the nearby Gyeongsan city which serves the Daegu region as a college town. Kyungpook National University (KNU) is one of the most highly ranked and well organized national universities in Korea. It holds high ranks in and around the city in many academic fields, while DGIST(Daegu Gyeongbuk Institute of Science and Technology) is recognized as one of Korea's top universities in the field of science and technology. DGIST is one of four ISTs in Korea, along with KAIST, UNIST and GIST. It was established under 'The Daegu Gyeongbuk Institute of Science and Technology Act (Act 699)' enacted on December 11, 2003. In 2019, DGIST was selected as 'Top 25 Rising Young Universities'. Daegu has two of the most prestigious private universities outside Seoul, Yeungnam University（YU）and Keimyung University. There are some smaller private universities such as Catholic University of Daegu and Daegu University. Daegu National University of Education offers elementary education training.

The other universities and colleges include Daegu Arts University, Daegu Cyber University, Daegu Haany University, Daegu Health College, Daegu Mirae College, Daegu Polytechnic College, Daegu Technical College, Daeshin University, Keimyung University, Kyongbuk Science College, Kyungil University, Taekyeung College, Yeungjin College, Yeungnam College of Science and Technology, and Youngnam Theological College and Seminary.

Medical institutions
Some large university hospitals make the city the medical hub of south-eastern Korea. The Kyungpook National University Hospital, founded as Daegu-dongin-uiwon in 1907 by the Japanese, is the best-known hospital in the city. The Dongsan Hospital (attached to Keimyung University), founded as Jejungwon in 1899, is one of the oldest western style medical clinics in Korea. The Yeungnam University Medical Center has the largest number of beds in the city. The yearly treatment amount of these tertiary hospitals is the second largest in South Korea after that of Seoul. The Daegu Catholic University Medical Center is also included in them.

Primary and secondary schools
Hamji High School
Kangbuk High School
Maecheon High School
Seongsan High School

International schools in Daegu include:
Daegu International School
Daegu Chinese Elementary School or Korea Daeguhwagyo Elementary School
Overseas Chinese High School, Daegu

Elementary schools

Global schools:
 * Daegu Sindang Elementary School

Transportation
Rail

Daegu is the hub of the Korean inland railroad traffic. The main railroad of the country, Gyeongbu Line passes through the city. The largest railroad station in the city, Dongdaegu Station, has the second largest passenger traffic in Korea after Seoul Station, it is the number one station in Korea for train stops, and the largest train traffic. All trains passing through Dongdaegu Station make a mandatory stop. The station re-opened in 2004 after extensive renovations serving the KTX highspeed train, Saemaul and Mugunghwa trains. All kinds of trains except KTX depart from Daegu Station, an all-new building with cinemas, restaurants and a department store, located near the city centre. It has the tenth largest passenger traffic in Korea. Daegu Line branches off from Gacheon station of Gyeongbu Line.

Metro

The city also has a metro system, consisting of two heavy rail lines. Line 1 crosses the city from northeast to southwest, while Line 2 crosses from west to east. Line 3 from northwest to southeast is an elevated monorail. All the lines are and will be operated by the Daegu Metropolitan Transit Corporation (DTRO). Another line will operate in a few years as a heavy rail system using the Gumi–Daegu–Gyeongsan section of Gyeongbu Line. Line 4 is a long-range plan and will be a circle line. Fare is 1400 won and 1250 won with a prepaid card. There is a free interchange scheme between the metro and bus within an hour of first use for the prepaid card users.

It started a full-fledged health-sharing stairway project by installing "Seven-color melody health donation stairs" at Shinmae Station and Imdang Station on Daegu Subway Line 2. Using these stairs, LED lights turn on with the sound of the keyboard. And a donation of ₩10(won) per session goes to those in need (such as pediatric cancer centers and low-income families).

Road
There are two types of buses which are local and limited express. Limited express buses have more seats, but often passengers are required to stand. , Local bus fare costs around 1,400 won with cash, Limited express bus fare would set you back 1,800 won. Discounted fare is available with a prepaid card.

Bus route numbers are made up with 3 digits, each number indicates the area that bus serves. For example, number 407 bus runs from zone four, to zone zero, and then to zone seven. Other routes, usually circular, are named for the districts they serve and numbered 1 through 3.

Traffic is sometimes heavy, however, the major thoroughfares handle fairly high volumes of traffic without too much trouble.

Air
Daegu is served by Daegu International Airport, located in northeastern Daegu. As of July, 2022, international destinations include China, Thailand, the Philippines, and Mongolia.

Bus

Others
Accidents
The Frog Boys, this incident is an unsolved case. 5 boys were killed by the criminal in 1991. Boys failed to return after going out to pick up the salamander eggs, and people often call the case "The frog boys case".
The 1995 Daegu gas explosions killed 101 and injured 202. A pagoda for consolation of the dead was erected in Haksan park. 
The Daegu subway fire occurred on February 18, 2003, when an arsonist, "Kim Dae-Han" set fire to a train at the Jungangno Station of the Daegu Metropolitan Subway in Daegu, South Korea. The fire spread across two trains within minutes, killing 192 people and injuring 151 others. It remains the deadliest deliberate loss of life in a single incident in South Korean peacetime history.

Notable people

Leaders
Roh Tae-woo – army general and thirteenth president of South Korea
Park Geun-hye – former president of South Korea, from 2013 to 2017, daughter of former president Park Chung-hee

Industrialists
Kim Woo-jung – Korean businessman, founder and former chairman of the Daewoo Group
Toni Ko – Businessperson and founder of NYX Cosmetics
Lee Kun-hee – a South Korean businessman who served as chairman of the Samsung Group from 1987 to 2008 and from 2010 to 2020, and is credited with the transformation of Samsung to the world's largest manufacturer of smartphones, televisions, and memory chips.

Religious
Kim Sou-hwan – first Korean Cardinal of the Catholic Church. His father escaped from his hometown of Chungcheong province for keeping his religion.

Writers
Jaegwon Kim – philosopher

Actors and actresses
Bong Joon-ho – director and screenwriter
Lee Chang-dong – director
Shin Seong-il – actor, director, and producer
Son Ye-jin – actress
Moon Chae-won – actress
Song Hye-kyo – actress
Min Hyo-rin – actress
Seo Ji-hoon – actor
Yoo Ah-in – actor
Jang Dong-yoon – actor
Yoon So-ho – actor
Tom Choi – actor
Kim Jung-woo – actor
Kim Min-jae – actor
Kim Hee-sun – actress
Sung Hoon – actor

Sports
Lee Man-Soo – baseball player
Yang Jun-Hyuk – baseball player
Lee Seung-Yeop – baseball player
Park Chu-Young – soccer player
Jin Sun-Yu – short-track speed skater, triple gold medalist at 2006 Winter Olympics
Bae Sang-moon – golfer, leading money winner on the Japan Golf Tour for the 2011 season
Choi Doo-ho – mixed martial artist

Beauties
Chang Yun-jong – first runner-up of the Miss Universe 1988, winner of the Miss Korea 1987
Son Tae-young – first runner-up of the Miss International 2000, second runner-up of the Miss Korea 2000, actress
Seo Eun-mi – first runner-up of the Miss International 2009, one of two first runners-up of the Miss Korea 2009
Yoo Ye-bin – winner of the Miss Korea 2013, competed in Miss Universe 2014

Singers
Min Yoon-gi (stage names Suga and Agust D) – rapper, songwriter, record producer and member of K-pop group BTS
Kim Tae-hyung (stage name V) – singer, songwriter, actor, composer, producer and member of K-pop group BTS.
Choi Beom-gyu — singer, songwriter, producer, and member of K-pop group Tomorrow X Together
Kim Ji-yeon (stage name Bona) – member of K-pop girl group Cosmic Girls
Kang Chan-hee (stage name Chani) – member of K-pop boy group SF9
Kim Ki-bum (stage name Key) – member K-pop boy group Shinee
Kim Min-jun (stage name Jun. K) – member of K-pop boy group 2PM
Lee Joo-heon (stage name Joohoney) – member of K-pop boy group Monsta X
Park Ji-young (stage name Kahi) – former leader and member of After School
Park So-jin – leader and member of K-pop girl group Girl's Day
Nancy Jewel McDonie (stage name Nancy) – member of K-pop girl group Momoland
Jang Da-hye (stage name Heize) – singer-songwriter, rapper, participant in Unpretty Rapstar 2
Kim Dong-han – former member of JBJ and member of WEi, a participant in Produce 101 (season 2)
Lee Seung-hyub – rapper, singer, instrumentalist, songwriter, actor, member of the South Korean band N.Flying
Bae Joo-hyun (stage name Irene), singer and actress, member and leader of Red Velvet

Other
Kim Yong-jun (art critic)
Sin Sung-gyeom – a Korean general during the Later Three Kingdoms period in the early tenth century
Yi Sang-hwa – a Korean nationalist poet active in the resistance to Japanese rule
Hyun Jin-geon – a Korean writer

In popular culture
Daegu serves as the setting for Season 1, Episode 6 of the HBO horror drama Lovecraft Country'' (2020). Set in 1949/50 the episode is a prolonged flashback or prequel to the main arc of the series, which takes place in 1955 in Chicago and Massachusetts, and depicts main character Atticus' experiences as a U.S. soldier during the Korean War.

Sister cities
Daegu is twinned with the following locations:
 Atlanta, United States (1981)
 Almaty, Kazakhstan (1990)
 Qingdao, China (1993)
 Belo Horizonte, Brazil (1994)
 Hiroshima, Japan (1997)
 Saint Petersburg, Russia (1997)
 Plovdiv, Bulgaria (2002)
 Taipei, Taiwan (2010)
 Ningbo, China (2013) 
 Milan, Italy (2015)
 Chengdu, China (2015)
 Milwaukee, United States (2017)
 Da Nang, Vietnam (2018)

Friendship cities 

 Yangzhou, Jiangsu, China (2003)
 Yancheng, Jiangsu, China (2003)
 Shenyang, Liaoning, China (2003)
 Kobe, Hyōgo, Japan (2010)
 Ho Chi Minh City, Vietnam (2015)
 Shaoxing, Zhejiang, China (2015)
 Wuhan, Hubei, China (2016)
 Bangkok, Thailand (2017)
 Changsha, Hunan, China (2018)
 Kaohsiung, Taiwan (2018)
 Bắc Ninh Province, Vietnam (2019)
 Lille, France (2019)
 Yanbian, China (2021)

See also 
Gususan Library
Gyeongsang
History of Daegu
List of cities in South Korea

Notes

References

Citations

Bibliography
.

Further reading

External links

 
Daegu : Official Site of Korea Tourism Org 
City Bus Schedule and Routes
http://www.diof.org Daegu International Opera Festival

Daegu
Special Cities and Metropolitan Cities of South Korea